Ștefan Constantin Bănică (November 11, 1933 – May 27, 1995) was a Romanian actor and singer from Călărași. Aside from starring in multiple films, he was also known for his interpretation of songs such as "Îmi acordați un dans", "Cum am ajuns să te iubesc", "Gioconda se mărită", "Hei, coșar, coșar", and "Astă seară mă fac praf". His son, Ștefan Bănică Jr., is also well known in the entertainment industry.

He was born in a house situated on Călărași Street (nowadays Pompierilor Street), in Călărași; his father was Drăgan Constandache Bănică, a lăutar.

On World Theater Day 2016, Bănică posthumously received a star on the Walk of Fame  in Bucharest, as a sign of recognition and appreciation for his entire activity in the field of theater and film.

Filmography
  (1965)
 Golgota (1966)
 Haiducii (1966)
 Tunelul (1967)
  (1967)
  Zile de vară (1968)
  (1968)
  (1970)
 Cîntecele mării (1970)
 Brigada Diverse în alertă! (1971)
  (1973)
  (1973)
  (1974)
 Fair Play (1977)
 Septembrie (1978)
  (1978)
 Nea Mărin miliardar (1979)
  (1979)
 De ce trag clopotele, Mitică? (1982)
  (1990)
 Cel mai iubit dintre pământeni (1993)

References

External links

1933 births
1995 deaths
People from Călărași
Romani male actors
Romanian male film actors 
20th-century Romanian male singers
20th-century Romanian singers
20th-century Romanian male actors